Palina Pivavarava (born 12 October 1994) is a track cyclist from Belarus, who most recently rode for UCI Women's Team . In 2015, she won the bronze medal in the team pursuit at the 2015 UEC European Track Championships in Grenchen, Switzerland. She also rode at the 2015 UCI Track Cycling World Championships.

Career results
2014
 2nd  Team pursuit, UEC European Under-23 Track Championships (with Volha Masiukovich, Ina Savenka and Marina Shmayankova)  
2015
 UEC European Under-23 Track Championships
1st Team pursuit (with Katsiaryna Piatrouskaya, Ina Savenka and Marina Shmayankova)
3rd  Points race
 3rd Team pursuit, UEC European Track Championships (with Katsiaryna Piatrouskaya, Ina Savenka and Marina Shmayankova)

References

External links

1994 births
Belarusian female cyclists
Living people
Place of birth missing (living people)
Belarusian track cyclists
Cyclists at the 2019 European Games
European Games competitors for Belarus
21st-century Belarusian women